Mount Shasta Union School District is a public school district in Siskiyou County, California, United States.

External links
 

School districts in Siskiyou County, California